Whiteout (French: Whiteout: Enfer blanc) is a 2009 crime thriller film based on the 1998 comic book of the same name by Greg Rucka and Steve Lieber. Directed by Dominic Sena and starring Kate Beckinsale, Gabriel Macht,  Columbus Short and Tom Skerritt. The film was distributed by Warner Bros. and released on September 11, 2009. It was produced under the banner of Dark Castle Entertainment by Joel Silver, Susan Downey and David Gambino.

The film is set in Antarctica, where Special Deputy U.S. Marshal Carrie Stetko (Kate Beckinsale) is planning to leave in a few days. After finding a dead body, Stetko is attacked by a masked killer who is trying to get hold of the cargo in an old Soviet plane that crash-landed in the ice during the Cold War.

Plot 
In 1957, a Russian cargo plane is flying above Antarctica. In the cargo hold, three Russians sit with a padlocked box. The co-pilot leaves his seat and goes into the cargo hold, then begins to shoot the other men, who return fire. The chaos caused by the gunfight leads to a crash which kills all aboard.

In modern times, newcomers arrive at the United States' Amundsen–Scott South Pole Station in Antarctica, while  others who are scheduled to leave are preparing to do so early because of a storm. They must depart before the onset of winter or remain for six months. Special Deputy U.S. Marshal Carrie Stetko (Kate Beckinsale) has been working in Antarctica for two years, since a betrayal by her partner in Miami that killed him and nearly killed her. She plans to resign after returning to the United States in two days.

Stetko and pilot Delfy (Columbus Short) fly to the remote Haworth Mesa to retrieve a discovered body. The dead man is Anton Weiss (Marc James Beauchamp), one of a group of three scientists looking for meteorites. An autopsy finds evidence of murder by ax. A murder requires a federal investigation; Stetko considers sending the body to McMurdo Station to avoid spending another winter in Antarctica, but decides to continue the investigation. When Stetko goes to speak to one of the others at Vostok Station, she finds him dying from a neck wound and is herself attacked by a black-clad man with an ax. Stetko injures her hands in escaping, losing the wet skin of her fingers on the metal handle of a door. Later, she finds Robert Pryce (Gabriel Macht), a United Nations security agent, examining the body of the second scientist. They conclude that the third, who is missing, must be the killer and set out to explore the group's most recent search site. There, Stetko falls through the ice to find the old Russian cargo plane. Pryce and Delfy join her to investigate, and they realize that the locked box had been opened and six cylinders removed. Pryce reveals that it is possible that nuclear fuel of interest to arms traffickers may be in the cylinders.

Stetko must have her badly frostbitten fingers amputated by Doc. She then finds the missing scientist hiding in her office. He tells her that he and his two companions found the plane and took the canisters, but the killer has them now. Before Stetko can protect him he is killed, but Stetko captures his killer, who is revealed to be Australian biologist Russell Haden (Alex O'Loughlin). The base commander orders everyone to evacuate because of the murders. With Haden locked in the brig and the winter storm near, Stetko and Pryce search for the canisters. However, Haden manages to escape and starts pursuing Stetko and Pryce. The three end up outside the base in a cat-and-mouse chase while the winter storm happens, and just when Haden corners and is about to kill Pryce, Stetko arrives and cuts Haden's safety rope and he is blown away due to the storm, cracking his skull onto one of the base's support pillars killing him instantly.

Stetko checks the last departing plane's cargo manifest and learns that the bodies of the dead scientists were not aboard. She searches their body bags and notices that the stitching on Weiss's old wound matches the distinctive pattern on her amputated fingers. Stetko explores the body and finds several bags of large, uncut diamonds. Doc confesses that he was part of a diamond smuggling ring with the others before Haden killed the rest. He had hoped that the diamonds would make him wealthy outside Antarctica. When Doc tells Stetko he wants to see the aurora australis one last time, she allows him to walk outside to his death.

Six months later, Stetko, Pryce, and Delfy have wintered at the facility. She transmits an email to her superior, rescinding her previous resignation and asking for a warmer location for her assignment.

Cast 
 Kate Beckinsale as Carrie Stetko, the Special Deputy U.S. Marshal investigating the killings at the base.
 Gabriel Macht as Robert Pryce, a UN security agent who aids Stetko in the investigation.
 Columbus Short as Delfy, a pilot who helps Stetko in the investigation.
 Tom Skerritt as Dr. John Fury, the base doctor.
 Alex O'Loughlin as Russell Haden, a biologist.
 Shawn Doyle as Sam Murphy, the station's manager.
 Jesse Todd as Rubin
 Joel Keller as Jack
 Arthur Holden as McGuire
 Erin Hicock as Rhonda
 Bashar Rahal as Russian Pilot
 Julian Cain as Russian co-pilot
 Roman Varshavky, Dennis Keiffer, and Andrei Runtso as Russian guards
 Steve Lucescu as Mooney
 Paula Jean Hixson as Lab Tech
 Craig A. Pinckes as Craig Pinckes
 Sean Tucker as Operations Tech 
 Marc James Beauchamp as Anton Weiss
 Nick Villarin as Newbie
 Louis Dionne as Man in Hall
 Patrick Sabongui as Miami Prisoner

Production 
In November 1999, Columbia Pictures acquired feature film rights to the comic book Whiteout by Greg Rucka and Steve Lieber. An adapted screenplay for the film was written by Jon and Erich Hoeber. The script was written to have a male character star opposite the female lead, since the studio was hesitant on how large a film audience the original setup of two female leads would draw. By November 2002, the studio placed the project on turnaround after a lack of production, and the rights were acquired by Universal Studios. The studio cast Reese Witherspoon to star in Whiteout, which would be based on the screenplay written by the Hoebers.  By May 2004, a second draft of the script had been written, and a director was still being sought. Ultimately, rights over the film changed ownership, detaching Witherspoon from the project.

In October 2006, Whiteout entered development at Dark Castle Entertainment, with production slated to begin in the coming winter for a release date in the first quarter of 2008. Dominic Sena, a fan of the graphic novel since its '98 debut, had sought to acquire the rights to direct a film adaptation, and when rights were acquired by Dark Castle, Sena petitioned to producer Joel Silver, president of the company, for the opportunity to direct Whiteout. In February 2007, with Warner Bros. signed on to distribute Whiteout, Sena was hired to direct the film, based on the adapted screenplay by the Hoebers. In the same month, Beckinsale was cast in the lead role. Production began on March 5, 2007 in Manitoba, with later footage being shot in Montreal, Quebec. A set was also constructed on the shore of Lake Winnipeg. The film was primarily set in a bright world of ice and sunlight, an unconventional approach to the murder mystery genre. Both real and fake snow were used in production. The author of the graphic novel, Greg Rucka, applauded the film adaptation of his source material, but upon seeing the finished film felt differently, saying that "Comic Carrie and One Act Play Carrie would shake Movie Carrie down behind the bleachers, laugh her out of the You Share Our Name Club, and send her limping and mewling home to mother. And they wouldn't feel a moment's regret about doing it, either.". Filming concluded a few weeks before Comic-Con in July 2007.

Reception

Critical response
Whiteout was panned by critics. Based on 113 reviews collected by Rotten Tomatoes, the film has a 'rotten' 7% approval rating  from critics, with an average score of 3.5/10, and its consensus reading, "Kate Beckinsale is as lovely as ever, and does her best with the material, but moribund pacing and an uninspired plot leave Whiteout in the cold.". By comparison, from Metacritic, which assigns a normalized rating out of 100 to reviews from mainstream critics, the film received an average score of 28, based on 19 reviews.

AOL.com's Moviefone staff rated it as the eighth worst movie of 2009. Richard Roeper of the Chicago Sun Times gave the film two stars out of four, calling it a "formulaic thriller that is ultimately no less predictable or interesting simply because it is set in the coldest and most isolated place on Earth." Online critics at Zap2it claim, "The film moves like frozen molasses, letting the audience get out ahead of the narrative developments at every turn."

Box office
The film was released to U.S. theaters on September 11, 2009. It was a box office bomb. The film continued to have major decreases in ticket sales, and has a gross of $10,275,638 to date. It has grossed only $7,565,229 internationally to date, bringing the total return to just $17,840,867 from a budget of $35 million.

Release
The theatrical release was on September 11, 2009. The film was released on DVD and Blu-ray on January 19, 2010.

References

External links 
 Audio interviews
 
 
 
 
 
 

2009 films
2009 crime thriller films
American crime thriller films
Canadian crime thriller films
Dark Castle Entertainment films
English-language Canadian films
English-language French films
Films about murderers
Films based on American comics
Films directed by Dominic Sena
Films produced by Joel Silver
Films set in Antarctica
Films shot in Manitoba
Films shot in Montreal
Films scored by John Frizzell (composer)
Live-action films based on comics
McMurdo Station
United States Marshals Service in fiction
2000s survival films
Warner Bros. films
Oni Press adaptations
2000s American films
2000s Canadian films